St Martin-in-the-Fields is a church in London, England.

St Martin-in-the-Fields, and similar, may also refer to:

St Martin-in-the-Fields (painting), an 1888 painting by William Logsdail
St Martin-in-the-Fields (parish), a civil parish abolished in 1922
St Martin-in-the-Fields High School for Girls
Academy of St Martin in the Fields, a chamber orchestra
St Martin-in-the-Fields, a church in Finham, Coventry

See also
 Saint-Martin-des-Champs (disambiguation)